Ramsahai Pandey (14 September 1920 – 21 September 1987) was an Indian politician. He was elected to the Lok Sabha, the lower house of the Parliament of India from Rajnandgaon, Madhya Pradesh as a member of the Indian National Congress.

Pandey died in Bombay on 21 September 1987, at the age of 67.

References

External links
Official biographical sketch in Parliament of India website

1920 births
1987 deaths
India MPs 1971–1977
Indian National Congress politicians
Lok Sabha members from Madhya Pradesh